Charles Dionne (born 15 March 1979) is a Canadian former professional road cyclist.

Major results

1998
 1st Overall Tour de Toona
1999
 1st Stage 5 Tour de Hokkaido
2002
 1st San Francisco Grand Prix
 1st Stages 2, 4 & 7 Tour de Toona
 1st Stage 4 Redlands Bicycle Classic
 3rd Clarendon Cup
 5th Road race, National Road Championships
2003
 1st Stage 4 Redlands Bicycle Classic
 6th Wachovia Classic
2004
 1st San Francisco Grand Prix
 1st Stage 3 Tour de Beauce
 1st Stage 5 Redlands Bicycle Classic
 1st Stage 5 Cascade Cycling Classic
 3rd Overall Tour of Wellington
1st Stage 2
2005
 1st  Criterium, National Road Championships
 1st Stage 5 Tour de Beauce
 2nd  Road race, Pan American Cycling Championships
2007
 1st  Criterium, National Road Championships
 5th Reading Classic
 7th Philadelphia International Cycling Classic
2008
 1st Stages 2 & 4 Tour de Québec
 4th Tour de Leelanau
 10th Overall Rochester Omnium
2009
 1st Stage 5 Tour de Beauce
 2nd US Air Force Cycling Classic
 2nd Overall Fitchburg Longsjo Classic
1st Stages 3 & 4
 3rd Overall Tour de Québec
2010
 1st Stage 4 Fitchburg Longsjo Classic

References

External links

1979 births
Living people
Canadian male cyclists
People from Lévis, Quebec